PS Shamrock was a paddle steamer passenger vessel operated by the London and North Western Railway from 1876 to 1898.

History

She was built by Cammell Laird for the London and North Western Railway in 1876. 

On 15 January 1877, she collided with the schooner John Bright at Holyhead, Anglesey, severely damaged the schooner. Shamrock rescued her crew and the schooner was beached. On 9 October 1880, She ran down and sunk the schooner Hannah off the coast of County Dublin, killing three of the schooner's four crew. Shamrock rescued the survivor. The schooner was not showing any lights. On 12 April 1881, she ran down and sunk the tug General Havelock in the River Liffey. There were no deaths.

She was taken out of service in August 1898.

References

1876 ships
Passenger ships of the United Kingdom 
Steamships
Ships built on the River Mersey
Ships of the London and North Western Railway 
Paddle steamers of the United Kingdom
Steamships of the United Kingdom